Wavetable synthesis is a sound synthesis technique used to create quasi-periodic waveforms often used in the production of musical tones or notes.

Development  
Wavetable synthesis was invented by Max Mathews in 1958 as part of MUSIC II. MUSIC II “had four-voice polyphony and was capable of generating sixteen wave shapes via the introduction of a wavetable oscillator.”

Hal Chamberlin discussed wavetable synthesis in Byte's September 1977 issue. Wolfgang Palm of Palm Products GmbH (PPG) developed his version in the late 1970s and published it in 1979. The technique has since been used as the primary synthesis method in synthesizers built by PPG and Waldorf Music and as an auxiliary synthesis method by Ensoniq and Access. It is currently used in hardware synthesizers from Waldorf Music and in software synthesizers for PCs and tablets, including apps offered by PPG and Waldorf, among others.

It was also independently developed by Michael McNabb, who used it in his 1978 composition Dreamsong.

Principle 

Wavetable synthesis is fundamentally based on periodic reproduction of multiple arbitrary, single-cycle waveforms. In wavetable synthesis, some method is employed to vary or modulate the selected waveform in the wavetable.  The position in the wavetable selects the single cycle waveform. Digital interpolation between adjacent waveforms allows for dynamic and smooth changes of the timbre of the tone produced. Sweeping the wavetable in either direction can be controlled in a number of ways, for example, by use of an LFO, envelope, pressure or velocity.

Many wavetables used in PPG and Ensoniq synthesizers can simulate the methods used by analog synthesizers, such as pulse-width modulation by utilising a number of square waves of different duty cycles. In this way, when the wavetable is swept, the duty cycle of the pulse wave will appear to change over time. As the early Ensoniq wavetable synthesizers had non resonant filters (the PPG Wave synthesizers used analogue Curtis resonant filters), some wavetables contained highly resonant waveforms to overcome this limitation of the filters.

Confusion with sample-based synthesis (S&S) and Digital Wave Synthesis 

In 1992, with the introduction of the Creative Labs Sound Blaster 16 the term "wavetable"  started to be (incorrectly) applied as a marketing term to their sound card. However, these sound cards did not employ any form of wavetable synthesis, but rather PCM samples and FM synthesis.

S&S (Sample and Synthesis) and Digital Wave Synthesis was the main method of sound synthesis utilised by digital synthesizers starting in the mid 1980s with synthesizers such as Sequential Circuits Prophet VS, Korg DW6000/8000 (DW standing for Digital Wave), Roland D50 and Korg M1 through to current synthesizers.

Ableton addressed some confusion in an article:

Often they now have displays showing a real time 3d graphs of the wave table being played back with the current waveform highlighted which is the signature feature common in modern wavetable synths.

User wavetables 

The creation of new wavetables was previously a difficult process unless supported by specialized editing facilities and (near) real-time playback of edited wavetables on the synthesizer.  Such editors often required the use of extra hardware devices like the PPG Waveterm or were only present in expensive models like the Waldorf WAVE.  More commonly, pre-computed wavetables could be added via memory cards or sent to the synthesizer via MIDI.  Today, wavetables can be created more easily by software and auditioned directly on a computer.  Since all waveforms used in wavetable synthesis are periodic, the time-domain and frequency-domain representation are exact equivalents of each other and both can be used simultaneously to define waveforms and wavetables.

Practical use 

During playback, the sound produced can be harmonically changed by moving to another point in the wavetable, usually under the control of an envelope generator or low frequency oscillator but frequently by any number of modulators (matrix modulation). Doing this modifies the harmonic content of the output wave in real time, producing sounds that can imitate acoustic instruments or be totally abstract, which is where this method of sound creation excels. The technique is especially useful for evolving synth pads, where the sound changes slowly over time.

It is often necessary to 'audition' each position in a wavetable and to scan through it, forwards and backwards, in order to make good use of it, though selecting random wavetables, start positions, end positions and directions of scan can also produce satisfying musical results.  It is worth noting that most wavetable synthesizers also employ other synthesis methods to further shape the output waveform, such as subtractive synthesis (filters), phase modulation, frequency modulation and AM (ring) modulation.

Table-lookup synthesis 

Table-lookup synthesis (or Wavetable-lookup synthesis)  is a class of sound synthesis methods using the waveform tables by table-lookup, called "table-lookup oscillator" technique.
The length of waveforms or samples  may be varied by each sound synthesis method, from a single-cycle up to several minutes.

Terminologies 
The term "waveform table" (or "wave shape table" as equivalent) is often abbreviated to "wavetable", and its derived term "wavetable oscillator" seems to be almost the same as "table-lookup oscillator" mentioned above, although the word "wave" (or "waveform", "wave shape") may possibly imply a nuance of single-cycle waveform.

However, the derived term "wavetable synthesis" seems slightly confused by the later developments of derived algorithm.

(1) Wavetable synthesisIts original meaning is essentially the same as "table-lookup synthesis", and possibly several actions on waveform(s) may be expected. ⇒See (2), (3)

(2) Wavetable-modification algorithmFor example, Karplus–Strong string synthesis is a simple class of "wavetable-modification algorithm" known as digital waveguide synthesis.

(3) Multiple wavetable synthesisIn the late-1970s, Michael McNabb and Wolfgang Palm independently developed the multiple wavetable extension on the table-lookup synthesis which was typically used on PPG Wave and known as wavetable sweeping.

(4) Sample-based synthesisSimultaneously, since the late-1970s, sample-based synthesis using relatively long samples instead of single-cycle waveforms has become pervasive due to the introduction of the Fairlight CMI and E-mu Emulator.

Background
On the above four terminologies for the classes of sound synthesis methods — i.e., (1) Wavetable synthesis, (2) Wavetable-modification algorithm, (3) Multiple wavetable synthesis, and (4) Sample-based synthesis — 
if these had been appropriately used to distinguish each other, any confusions could be avoided, but it seems failed historically.
In the 1990s at the latest, several influential sample-based synthesis products were marketed under the trade names similar to "wavetable synthesis" (including Gravis Ultrasound wavetable card, Creative Wave Blaster wavetable daughterboard, and Microsoft GS Wavetable SW Synth), and these confusions have further affected industry standards (including MPEG-4 Structured Audio algorithmic and wavetable synthesis, and AC97 optional hw acceleration wavetable synth).
In the mid-2000s, confusion in terminology cropped up yet-again. A subclass of generic wavetable synthesis, i.e. McNabb and Palm's multiple wavetable synthesis, tends to be erroneously referred as if it was a generic class of whole wavetable synthesis family, exclusively.

As a result, the difficulty of maintaining consistency between concepts and terminology during rapid technological development is noteworthy.
For this reason the term "Table-lookup synthesis" is explained at length in this article.

See also
 HuC6280A
 MUSIC-N
 Direct digital synthesizer
 Sample-based synthesis

Notes

References

Bibliography 

 
  Copy on MusicDSP

External links 
  GPL application with graphical interface written in C by Camille Bassuel,  implementing several DSP tools, including DFT to generate a wavetable set

Sound synthesis types

ja:デジタルシンセサイザー#ウェーブテーブル・シンセシス